Alikovskoye Rural Settlement (Elĕk jal tărăkhĕ) is an administrative and municipal division (a rural settlement) of Alikovsky District of the Chuvash Republic, Russia. It is located in the central part of the district. Its administrative center is the rural locality (a selo) of Alikovo. Rural settlement's population: 4,291 (2006 est.).

Alikovskoye Rural Settlement comprises ten rural localities.

The Cheboksary–Yadrin and the Cheboksary–Krasnye Chetai highways cross the territory of the rural settlement.

See also
Church of the Assumption of the Virgin (Alikovo)

References

Notes

Sources

Further reading
L. A. Yefimov, "Alikovsky District" ("Элӗк Енӗ"), Alikovo, 1994.
"Аликовская энциклопедия" (Alikovsky District's Encyclopedia), authors: Yefimov L. A., Yefimov Ye. L., Ananyev A. A., Terentyev G. K. Cheboksary, 2009, .

External links
Official website of Alikovskoye Rural Settlement 

Alikovsky District
Rural settlements of Chuvashia

